Vid is a common Christian given name in Slovenia, Serbia and Croatia. It is the Slavic form of the Latin Vitus, the name of the Christian Saint Vitus.

Notable people with the name include:

 Vid Belec, Slovenian footballer
 Vid Juricskay, Australian canoer
 Vid Kavtičnik, Slovenian handball player
 Vid Khissel (Veit Khisl), Slovenian politician
 Vid Milenkovic (born 1995), Swiss basketball player
 Vid Morpurgo, Croatian industrialist, publisher, and politician
 Vid Pečjak, Slovenian psychologist
 Vid Vuletić Vukasović, Serbian ethnographer
 Petar Vid Gvozdanović (Peter Vitus von Quosdanovich), Austrian general

Slavic masculine given names
Slovene masculine given names
Croatian masculine given names